Dusty is a 1983 Australian film about the friendship between a drover (Bill Kerr) and his part-dingo dog, Dusty.

Based on the popular novel by Frank Dalby Davison, it was shot on location in northern Victoria.

Television series

The film led to a mini series which cost $3 million.

References

External links

Dusty at Oz Movies

1983 films
Australian drama films
Films about dogs
1980s English-language films
1980s Australian films